Do or Die is the first studio album released by Boston's Irish-American punk band, Dropkick Murphys. It was released in 1998. A music video for the single "Barroom Hero" was released. This is the only album that featured original lead vocalist Mike McColgan, who went on to become a fireman before forming his own band, the Street Dogs.

Reception

Allmusic gave Do or Die a rating of three stars out of five, and said that the album was "an interesting blend of hardcore-style punk with traditional Irish inflections."

In other media
A Do or Die poster appears on the wall of John Connor's bedroom in the pilot episode of Terminator: The Sarah Connor Chronicles.
"Barroom Hero" was used in the final credits of the documentary Restrepo.
"Never Alone" was featured in the Extreme sports video game Dave Mirra Freestyle BMX. "Cadence to Arms" was featured in the season 1 episode of 'The Sopranos' "College".

Track listing
Many songs were a collaborative effort.
 "Cadence to Arms" (Instrumental) (Traditional, reworked from "Scotland the Brave") – 1:49
 "Do or Die" (Barton, McColgan) – 1:50
 "Get Up" (Barton, Casey, McColgan) – 2:06
 "Never Alone" (Barton, Casey) - 2:54
 "Caught in a Jar" (Barton, McColgan) - 2:19
 "Memories Remain" (Casey, Kelly) – 2:25
 "Road of the Righteous" (Barton, McColgan) – 2:56
 "Far Away Coast" (Barton, Casey, McColgan) – 2:41
 "Fightstarter Karaoke" (Barton, Casey) – 2:18
 "Barroom Hero" (Casey) – 2:57
 "3rd Man In" (Barton, Casey) – 2:18
 "Tenant Enemy #1" (Barton, Casey, Kelly, McColgan) – 2:13
 "Finnegan's Wake" (Traditional) – 2:19
 "Noble" (Barton, Casey, Kelly, McColgan) – 2:34
 "Boys on the Docks" (Murphys' Pub Version) (Barton, Casey) – 2:33
 "Skinhead on the MBTA" (Traditional, reworked from M.T.A.) (Barton, Casey) – 3:49

Personnel
Mike McColgan – lead vocals
Ken Casey – bass guitar, vocals
Rick Barton – guitar, vocals
Matt Kelly – drums
Joe Delaney - bagpipes
Swingin' Utters - featured on the track "Skinhead on the MBTA"
John Allen of Big Bad Bollocks, vocals and tin whistle on "Faraway Coast"

References

Dropkick Murphys albums
1998 debut albums
Hellcat Records albums